Fast fission is fission that occurs when a heavy atom absorbs a high-energy neutron, called a fast neutron, and splits. Most fissionable materials need thermal neutrons, which move more slowly.

Fast reactors vs. thermal reactors
Fast neutron reactors use fast fission to produce energy, unlike most nuclear reactors. In a conventional reactor, a moderator is needed to slow down the neutrons so that they are more likely to fission atoms. A fast neutron reactor uses fast neutrons, so it does not use a moderator. Moderators may absorb a lot of neutrons in a thermal reactor, and fast fission produces a higher average number of neutrons per fission, so fast reactors have better neutron economy making a plutonium breeder reactor possible. However, a fast neutron reactor must use relatively highly enriched uranium or plutonium so that the neutrons have a better chance of fissioning atoms.

Fissionable but not fissile
Some atoms, notably uranium-238, do not usually undergo fission when struck by slow neutrons, but do split when struck with neutrons of high enough energy. The fast neutrons produced in a hydrogen bomb by fusion of deuterium and tritium have even higher energy than the fast neutrons produced in a nuclear reactor. This makes it possible to increase the yield of any given fusion weapon by the simple expedient of adding layers of cheap natural (or even depleted) uranium. Fast fission of uranium-238 provides a large part of the explosive yield, and fallout, in many designs of hydrogen bomb.

Differences in fission product yield
A graph of fission product yield against the mass number of the fission fragments has two pronounced but fairly flat peaks, at around 90 to 100, and 130 to 140. With thermal neutrons, yields of fission products with mass between the peaks, such as 113mCd, 119mSn, 121mSn, 123Sn, 125Sb, 126Sn, and 127Sb are very low.

The higher the energy of the state that undergoes nuclear fission, the more likely a symmetric fission is, hence as the neutron energy increases and/or the energy of the fissioning atom increases, the valley between the two peaks becomes more shallow; for instance, the curve of yield against mass for 239Pu has a more shallow valley than that observed for 235U, when the neutrons are thermal neutrons. The curves for the fission of the later actinides tend to make even more shallow valleys. In extreme cases such as 259Fm, only one peak is seen.

References

Nuclear physics
Nuclear fission